James Leadbeater (born 4 January 1989, Panteg) is a Welsh rugby union player. He is a Wales under 20 international.

A scrum half, he played for Cross Keys RFC and progressed through the Newport Gwent Dragons academy.
He made his debut for the Dragons regional team 20 December 2009 against Biarritz Olympique in the Heineken Cup.

He was released by Newport Gwent Dragons at the end of the 2011–12 season and joined Newport RFC

References

External links
Newport Gwent Dragons profile

1989 births
Living people
Dragons RFC players
Newport RFC players
Rugby union players from Panteg
Welsh rugby union players
Rugby union scrum-halves